Ao Phang Nga National Park is in Phang Nga Province in southern Thailand. It includes coastal sections of Mueang Phang Nga District and Takua Thung District. Most of the park consists of an area of the Strait of Malacca studded with numerous limestone tower karst islands. The best known of these islands is Khao Phing Kan, popularly called "James Bond Island" because it was used as a location for the James Bond movie The Man with the Golden Gun.

The dramatic appearance of the islands with their sheer sides has made the area a popular tourist attraction. The park also protects the largest area of native mangrove forest remaining in Thailand.

History
The park was created by royal decree and announced in the Royal Gazette under proclamation number 98, section 64, 29 April 1981. It occupies 250,000 rai ~ .

Environment
The effects of mass tourism on the park prompted Fodor's Travel to place the park on their "No List" for 2018, suggesting that tourists skip the park in order to allow it to recuperate from being loved to death.

Geology
According to its structure and geomorphology, it is a mountain range that originated approximately between the Cretaceous and the early Tertiary period, approximately 136-36  million years ago. It is also the result of a structural feature known as fault. "Khlong Marui fault" and "Phang Nga fault." There are also sedimentary rock and metamorphic mountains interspersed in line, especially in the limestone mountains. As a result of this change in the natural environment, many holes or caves are formed.  

Prehistoric evidence of human habitation was discovered in 1987 at Khao Tao in Phang Nga Bay National Park by a discovery of human burial grounds. By study fossils of shells in caves and rocks on islands in Phang Nga bay, it was found that during the Pleistocene and early Holocene epochs, about 11,000 years ago, sea levels dropped significantly during the Ice Age. The rocky mountains that are islands as seen today are mostly on the upland. Around 7,500-8,500 years ago, the sea level gradually rose to around 4.5 meters above current sea level. Around 4,000-5,000 years ago, sea levels interchangeably rose and fell. Around 2,700-3,700 years ago, sea level was relatively stable but were 1.5 and 2.5 meters higher than the present. Around 1,500 years ago, the sea level was 1.5 meters higher than the present.

Flora and Fauna
Within Ao Phang-nga contains one of the largest and best-preserved mangrove forests in Thailand.  

The forest has important functions in the coastal ecosystem, such as a natural storm barrier and a breeding ground for marine living animals.  

Common plant species in the mangrove forest are Rhizophora apiculata, Rhizophora mucronata, Avicennia alba, Avicennia officinalis, Bruguiera cylindrica, Bruguiera parviflora, and the cannonball trees Xylocarpus granatum and Xylocarpus moluccensis. Inside the islands, tropical rainforest grows with species such as Hopea ferrea, the pea plant Parkia timoriana, and Acacia catechu, the mulberry tree Artocarpus lacucha, the Clusia tree Garcinia cowa and Morinda coreia, and on more calcareous soil Colocasia gigantea, Pandanus monotheca, and Cycas ingas.   

An inventory in 1991 resulted in 206 animal species, divided into 17 mammal species, 88 bird species, 18 reptile species, 3 amphibians, 24 fish species and 45 other marine animals.  

The lar gibbon and serow has previously been found in the area, but now become extinct in the region.  

Endangered mammal species within the national park are smooth-coated otter, leaf monkeys, and smoky leaf monkeys and the crab-eating macaque.  

The brahminy kite, pacific reef heron, white-bellied sea eagle, many species of kingfishers, asian dowitcher, and edible-nest swiftlet are species of birds that could be found here.  

Among reptiles and amphibians, mangroves snakes, rhacophoridae, and saltwater frogs can be found here.

See also
List of national parks of Thailand
List of Protected Areas Regional Offices of Thailand

References

External links

National parks of Thailand
Protected areas established in 1981
Geography of Phang Nga province
Tourist attractions in Phang Nga province
1981 establishments in Thailand
ASEAN heritage parks
Marine protected areas of Thailand